Al Maaref University (MU) : , is a private university in Lebanon. It is a subsidiary organization of the Islamic Association of Learning and Education (IALE) that has been operating since 1995.

History 

The decree of establishment (N.7265) was given by the Lebanese Ministry of Education and Higher Education (MEHE) on 22 December 2011. Al-Maaref University is accounted to date the 33rd university that is officially recognized by the Lebanese Ministry of Education and Higher Education (MEHE).

The university was inaugurated in October 2015 under the auspices of ministers of the Lebanese government, Hussein Hajj Hassan and the ambassador of the Islamic Republic of Iran Mohammad Fat'hali.

The first published university prospectus was dated July 2015. The university is guided by Article 10 of the Lebanese Constitution, the Educational Reforms as initiated by the National Reconciliation  Accord (Taef Agreement), and the international conventions for economic, social and cultural rights.

Organization 
The university is headed by board consisting of known academic backgrounds and ex ministers in the Lebanese government, that has organized Al Maaref into five faculties headed by Deans, led by a University President and guided by a Board of Trustees of 12 notable members of the Lebanese society.

Academics 
The faculties are:
 Engineering (FoE),
 Science (FoS),
 Business Administration (BA), 
 Mass Communication and Fine Arts (MCFA), 
 Religions and Humanities (RH) including Translation and Languages department.

Each of the current five faculties has departments running majors in different disciplines. The total number of majors leading to a recognized Bachelor degree is 18. The university has plans to expand the majors offered to students in the second and third year of its operations.

The Faculty of Engineering offers four majors in the following areas:
 Electrical and Electronics Engineering
 Mechanical Engineering
 Civil Engineering
 Computer Engineering and Technology

The Faculty of Science offers six majors in the following areas:
 Applied Statistics
 Mathematics
 Computer Science
 Physics
 Chemistry
 Biology

The Faculty of Business Administration runs eight majors in the following areas: 
 Accounting
 Banking and Finance
 Economics
 Human Resources Management
 Management
 International Business
 Marketing 
 Information Technology and Management Systems

The Faculty of Mass Communication and Fine Arts offers four majors in the following areas: 
 Media Studies
 Journalism and Digital Media
 Advertising and Public Relations
 Radio and Television

The Faculty of Religions and Human Sciences offers six majors in the following areas:
 Comparative Religions
 Quranic Studies and Prophetic Hadith
 History and Comparative Civilizations
 Islamic Studies
 Philosophy and Theology
 Language and Translations (English,  French, Arabic)

References

External links 

Ministry of Education and Higher Education
Council of Ministers 

Universities in Lebanon
Education in Beirut
Schools in Beirut
2011 establishments in Lebanon
Educational institutions established in 2011